A re'em, also reëm, is an animal mentioned nine times in the Hebrew Bible. It has been translated as "unicorn" in the King James Version, and in some Christian Bible translations as "oryx"  (which was accepted as the referent in Modern Hebrew), "wild ox", "wild bull", "buffalo" or "rhinoceros". Rabbi Natan Slifkin argues that it is the aurochs.

Translation
The King James Version of the Book of Job followed the Septuagint and Jerome's Vulgate in the translation of re'em into unicorn:

Some Bible translations into English, including the American Standard Version and New American Standard Bible, interpret re'em as "wild ox".

References

Jewish legendary creatures
Christian legendary creatures
Unicorns
Bovines